Roswell Preston "Ross" Bates (February 27, 1911 – July 14, 1975) was an American politician and physician from Maine. A Republican from Orono, Maine, Bates served in the Maine House of Representatives and was its Speaker from 1954 to 1955. He attended Bowdoin College and the Philadelphia College of Osteopathic Medicine.

References

1911 births
1975 deaths
American osteopathic physicians
People from Danvers, Massachusetts
People from Orono, Maine
Physicians from Maine
Bowdoin College alumni
Philadelphia College of Osteopathic Medicine alumni
Speakers of the Maine House of Representatives
Republican Party members of the Maine House of Representatives
20th-century American politicians